NGC 5198 is an elliptical galaxy in the constellation Canes Venatici. It was discovered by the astronomer William Herschel on May 12, 1787.

References

External links 
 

Canes Venatici
5198
Elliptical galaxies